Leon Bates (born 1949) is an American pianist.

Early life
Leon Bates was born in Philadelphia, where by the age of six he had excelled in the study of music, specifically at playing the piano and violin. As a young artist, Bates was an understudy of Irene Beck. He also was a student of Natalie Hinderas at the Esther Boyer College of Music at Temple University in Philadelphia.

While growing up, Leon Bates divided his time between two disparate passions: the pursuit of music and the physically demanding sport of body building. According to Karima A. Haynes, Leon Bates grew up defying stereotypes. Bates claims that the two disciplines have synergistic benefits. "The last piece on the program is the one that is the most demanding and dynamic. You don’t want to run out of energy as you are coming to the piece that demands the most from you.
(Haynes qtd Bates 164)."

Career
Bates has toured the world, performing with many symphonies. In the United States, he has performed with both Philadelphia and Cleveland Orchestras, as well as New York and Los Angeles Philharmonics. He also performed with various symphonies such as Atlanta, Boston, Detroit and the San Francisco Symphonies. In Europe, he has performed with various orchestras including Vienna and Basel Symphonies, the Radio-Orchestra of Dublin, the Strasbourg Philharmonic, Orchestra Sinfonica dell’Accademia Nazionale di Santa Cecilia, the Czech National Symphony Orchestra, Malmö Symphony of Sweden and more. One of his most highly regarded performances was with Lorin Maazel at the Orchestra of France. This concert was in celebration of the 500,000th piano built at Carnegie Hall but was held at La Scala in Milan. He has also composed prominent pieces of music with the accompaniment of Janet Vogt for a method book entitled Piano Discoveries.

References

External links
Rile Management Biography

1949 births
20th-century African-American musicians
20th-century American male musicians
20th-century American pianists
20th-century classical pianists
21st-century African-American musicians
21st-century American male musicians
21st-century American pianists
21st-century classical pianists
African-American classical composers
American classical composers
African-American classical pianists
African-American male classical composers
American classical pianists
American male classical composers
American male classical pianists
Classical musicians from Pennsylvania
Living people
Musicians from Philadelphia
Temple University alumni